Churilaca (possibly from Aymara churi dull yellow, laq'a earth (soil), "dull yellow earth") is a  mountain in the Andes of southern Peru. It is situated in the Moquegua Region, Mariscal Nieto Province, Carumas District, and in the Tacna Region, Candarave Province, Candarave District. Churilaca lies south-west of the mountain Challuma.

References

Mountains of Peru
Mountains of Moquegua Region
Mountains of Tacna Region